Hatra was an ancient city in Upper Mesopotamia located in present-day eastern Nineveh Governorate in northern Iraq.

Hatra was a strongly fortified caravan city and capital of the small Arab Kingdom of Hatra, located between the Roman and Parthian/Persian empires. Hatra flourished in the 2nd century, and was destroyed and deserted in the 3rd century. Its impressive ruins were discovered in the 19th century.

Name 
In Syriac, it is usually recorded in the plural form Ḥaṭrē.

The city was officially called Beit ʾElāhāʾ  "House of God", in Hatran Aramaic inscriptions and once recorded as "Enclosure of Shamash" (ḥtrʾ d-šmš ) on a coin.

History 
There is no archeological information on the city before the Parthian period but settlement in the area likely dates back to at least the Seleucid period. Hatra flourished under the Parthians, during the 1st and 2nd centuries AD, as a religious and trading center. Later on, the city became the capital of possibly the first Arab Kingdom in the chain of Arab cities running from Hatra, in the northeast, via Palmyra, Baalbek and Petra, in the southwest. The region controlled from Hatra was the Kingdom of Hatra, a semi-autonomous buffer kingdom on the western limits of the Parthian Empire, governed by Arabian princes.

Hatra became an important fortified frontier city and played an important role in the Second Parthian War, withstanding repeated attacks by the Roman Empire. During the 2nd century CE the city repulsed sieges by both Trajan (116/117) and Septimius Severus (198/199). Hatra's forces defeated the ascendant Sassanid Persians in 238 at the battle of Shahrazoor, but fell shortly after in 241 to the army of Sassanid king Shapur I and was destroyed. The traditional stories of the fall of Hatra tell of al-Nadirah, daughter of the King of Araba, who betrayed the city into the hands of Shapur as she fell in love with him. The story tells of how Shapur killed the king and married al-Nadirah, but later had her killed also after realizing her ingratitude towards her father.

Hatra was the best preserved and most informative example of a Parthian city. A temenos (τέμενος) surrounded the principal sacred buildings in the city's centre. The temples covered some 1.2 hectares and were dominated by the Great Temple, an enormous structure with vaults and columns that once rose to 30 metres. The city had temples to Nergal (Assyrian-Babylonian and Akkadian), Hermes (Greek), Atargatis (Syro-Aramaean), Allat, Shamiyyah (Arabian), and Shamash (the Mesopotamian sun god). Other deities mentioned in the Hatran Aramaic inscriptions were the Aramaean Ba'al Shamayn, and the female deity known as Ashurbel, which was perhaps the assimilation of the two deities the Assyrian god Ashur and the Babylonian Bel—despite their being individually masculine.

List of rulers 
In inscriptions found at Hatra, several rulers are mentioned. Other rulers are sporadically mentioned by classical authors. The earlier rulers are titled mrjʾ (māryā, "lord") and the later ones mlkʾ d-ʿrb ("king of the Arabs"; malkā, "king").

Art of Hatra
According to John M. Rosenfield, the statuary of Hatra belong to the Parthian cultural sphere, with numerous similarities in terms of clothing, decorative elements or posture, which tend to be massive and frontal, with feet often splayed. The architecture of Hatra itself is generally seen as an example of Parthian architecture. Similarities can be seen with the Art of the Kushans as well, due either to direct cultural exchanges between the area of Mesopotamia and the Kushan Empire at that time, or from a common Parthian artistic background leading to similar types of representation.

Modern Hatra 

Hatra was used as the setting for the opening scene in the 1973 film The Exorcist, and since 1985 has been a UNESCO World Heritage Site.

The site was first surveyed by Walter Andrae of the German excavation team working in Assur from 1906 to 1911. But systematic excavations have been undertaken only from 1951 by Iraqi archeologists. From the 1980s, the Italian Archaeological Expedition, directed by R. Ricciardi Venco (University of Turin), made major discoveries at Hatra. The excavations were focused on an important house ("Building A"), located close to the Temenos, and on deep soundings in the Temenos central area. Now the Expedition is active in different projects regarding the preservation and development of the archaeological site. In 1990, a Polish expedition of the Polish Centre of Mediterranean Archaeology University of Warsaw recorded and studied the city's defense walls. The team was directed by Michał Gawlikowski (PCMA UW).

In 2004, The Daily Telegraph stated "Hatra's finely preserved columns and statues make it one of the most impressive of Iraq's archaeological sites"

Restoration by Saddam Hussein 

Saddam Hussein saw the site's Mesopotamian history as reflecting glory on himself, and sought to restore the site, and others in Ninevah, Nimrud, Ashur and Babylon, as a symbol of Arab achievement, spending more than US$80 million in the first phase of restoration of Babylon. Saddam Hussein demanded that new bricks in the restoration use his name (in imitation of Nebuchadnezzar) and parts of one restored Hatra temple have Saddam's name.

Destruction by ISIL 
Actions by the Islamic State of Iraq and the Levant, which occupied the area in mid-2014, have been a major threat to Hatra. In early 2015 they announced their intention to destroy many artifacts, claiming that such "graven images" were un-Islamic, encouraged shirk (or polytheism), and could not be permitted to exist, despite the preservation of the site for 1,400 years by various Islamic regimes. ISIL militants pledged to destroy the remaining artifacts.  Shortly thereafter, they released a video showing the destruction of some artifacts from Hatra. After the bulldozing of Nimrud on March 5, 2015, "Hatra of course will be next" said Abdulamir Hamdani, an Iraqi archaeologist from Stony Brook University. On March 7, Kurdish and Iraqi official sources reported ISIS had begun the demolishing the ruins of Hatra. A video released by ISIL during the next month showed the destruction of the monuments.

UNESCO and ISESCO issued a joint statement saying "With this latest act of barbarism against Hatra, (the IS group) shows the contempt in which it holds the history and heritage of Arab people."

The pro-Iraqi government Popular Mobilization Forces captured the city on 26 April 2017. A spokeswoman for the militias stated that ISIL had destroyed the sculptures and engraved images of the site, but its walls and towers were still standing though contained holes and scratches received from ISIL bullets. PMF units also stated that the group had mined the site's eastern gates, thus temporarily preventing any assessment of damage by archaeologists. It was reported on 1 May that the site had suffered less damage than feared earlier. A journalist of EFE had earlier reported finding many destroyed statues, burnt buildings as well as signs of looting. Layla Salih, head of antiquities for Nineveh Governorate, stated that most of the buildings were intact and the destruction didn't compare with that of other archaeological sites of Iraq. A PMF commander also stated that the damage was relatively minor.

Gallery

Climate 
Hatra has a hot semi-arid climate (Köppen climate classification BSh). Most rain falls in the winter. About  of precipitation falls annually.

See also 

 Aramaic of Hatra
 Destruction of cultural heritage by ISIL
 Taq-i Kisra, sharing architectural features with structures at Hatra

References

Further reading

External links 

 Between Rome and Parthia: The Desert City of Hatra
 http://lexicorient.com/e.o/hathra.htm 
 http://www.britannica.com/eb/article-9039509
 http://shezaf.net/english/Video/Video/Hatra.html 
 http://www.bbc.co.uk/archive/chronicle/8612.shtml BBC Chronicle "Lost Kings of the Desert"
 https://hatrasite.com/ Italian Archaeological Expedition at Hatra
 Iraqi forces seize ancient UNESCO site of Hatra from Islamic State as jihadis execute Mosul civilians

 
Nineveh Governorate
Archaeological sites in Iraq
World Heritage Sites in Iraq
Parthian cities
Sasanian cities
Destroyed cities
Former populated places in Iraq
District capitals of Iraq
Buildings and structures destroyed by ISIL
Articles containing video clips
Arbayistan